Charles Vumomse better known as Vumomse is a Cameroonian Afro-pop and urban gospel musician and songwriter.

Early life and education 
Vumomse is a family nurse practitioner and an alumnus of South University, Georgia, United States with a master's degree. He is married to Peace Favor with whom they have four children.

Music career 
Vumomse released his first album Rakata in 2014. which earned him a nomination at the All Africa Music Award 'AFRIMA'. He is the Co Founder of Calabash Music Label and the Host of Solid Rock Worship Festival an annual worship concert which aims at winning souls for the Kingdom of God. Vumomse has performed and worked with many African Gospel Artiste including, Tim Godfrey, Mercy Chinwo, Uche Agu, Mokambe.

Discography

Album 

 Rakata (2014)

Selected singles 

 Shine Everyday
 Grace To Grass
 Move it

Recognition 

 Best male artiste in Inspiration - AFRIMA (2015)
 Best Gospel Artist and Best Male Artist - Urban Jamz Awards (2016)
 Best Gospel Artiste - DEA 2016

References 

Cameroonian musicians
Living people
Year of birth missing (living people)